Mitchell's Fruit Farms Limited, commonly known as Mitchell's, is a Pakistani food products company established by Francis J Mitchell in 1933. It consists of 720 acres of oasis in Renala Khurd, Okara District, Pakistan.

History
Mitchell's was founded by Francis J. Mitchell in 1933 in British India on a 720-acre plot of land near Renala Khurd, Okara District, which he leased from the Punjab, British India government. This would later become the Mitchell's Fruit Farms. Originally the company was registered at Lahore in April 1933 under the name Indian Mildura Fruit Farms Limited.

Then Syed Maratib Ali, maternal grandfather of Jugnu Mohsin and father of industrialists Syed Babar Ali and Syed Wajid Ali bought it from Francis J. Mitchell in 1958. Syed Maratib Ali's  son-in-law S.M. Mohsin was handed over complete control of Mitchell's Fruit Farms. He and his son Mehdi Mohsin ran the company until 2020. Jugnu Mohsin and her husband Najam Sethi took over the operational control in 2020 and Abdul Raheem became the Chairman of the company.

Future outlook
Mitchell's was one of the first food products companies to get an ISO 9001 quality accreditation in Pakistan. It manufactures and packages grocery items including fruit drinks, canned fruits and vegetables, sauces, pickles, jams and squashes. The company exports its products to the US, UK and the Middle Eastern countries. Mitchell's is one of the leading food products manufacturers and exporters in Pakistan.

Mitchell's is traded on the Pakistan Stock Exchange since 1993.

Brands 
Some of them are listed below:
 Mitchell's Mango Squash
 Mithchell's Orange Squash
 Mitchell's Lemon Squash
 Mitchell's Guava Squash
 Mitchell's Pineapple Squash
 Mitchell's Pomegranate Syrup
 Mitchell's Lemon Juice
 Mitchell's Tomato Ketchup
 Mitchell's Chilli Garlic Sauce
 Mitchell's Fruit Punch (new product introduced in 2016)

See also 
 List of food companies (see food companies list under Pakistan)

References

External links
 Mitchell's Official Website
 Mitchell's Farms Fruit Facts Info
 Our Story :Mitchell's Fruit Farms Limited

Food manufacturers of Pakistan
Pakistani brands
Farms in Pakistan
Fruit preserve companies
Companies listed on the Pakistan Stock Exchange
Ali family
Manufacturing companies based in Lahore
1933 establishments in British India
Companies established in 1933
1958 mergers and acquisitions